is an animal and flower park located on Port Island in Kobe, Japan. It is mainly located in and around a greenhouse. It was called  until 18 July 2014. It is one of several theme parks created by Japanese botanist and collector Kamo Mototeru, and was opened on 15 March 2006. This all-weather park is based on the concept of contact with birds and flowers. In the park, visitors are able to touch and feed birds.

On 20 November 2013, Kobe Kachoen went bankrupt. The management rights were acquired from Kobe Kachoen by the company Kobe Animal Kingdom in March 2014, and on 19 July 2014, the park was renamed Kobe Animal Kingdom.

Animals
As of 2022:
Sumatran Tiger Ecological Garden
Sumatran tiger

Rocky Valley
American black bear
Black-tailed prairie dog
Collared peccary
Cougar
Eastern wolf
North American beaver
Raccoon
Striped skunk

Otter Sanctuary
Asian small-clawed otter

Sheep Hill, Alpaca Space and Camel Corner
Alpaca
Bactrian camel
Corriedale sheep
Miniature horse
Miniature pig

Asian Forest
Binturong
Pallas's cat
Red panda

African Wetland

African sacred ibis
American white ibis
Black-necked stilt
Blacksmith lapwing
Common shelduck
Fennec fox
Great white pelican
Greater flamingo
Mallard
Mandarin duck
Marabou stork
Pygmy hippopotamus
Ringed teal
Ring-tailed lemur
Rock hyrax
Roseate spoonbill
Ruddy shelduck
Sand cat
Scarlet ibis
Serval

Shoebill Ecological Garden
Japanese night heron
Northern carmine bee-eater
Shoebill

Tropical Forest

Arapaima
Boat-billed heron
Bush dog
Capybara
Common marmoset
Cotton-top tamarin
Linnaeus's two-toed sloth
Northern Luzon giant cloud rat
Patagonian mara
Red-and-green macaw
South American tapir
Southern tamandua
Southern three-banded armadillo
Striped possum
Tambaqui
Tawny frogmouth
Victoria crowned pigeon
Violet turaco
Western plantain-eater
White-throated toucan

Tropical Wetland
Burmese python
Fishing cat
Green iguana
Malayan tapir
Red-bellied piranha

Aqua Valley
African penguin
South American fur seal
Spotted seal

Kangaroo Farm
African spurred tortoise
Aldabra giant tortoise
Axis deer
Red kangaroo

References

External links 

 
 Feel Kobe - sightseeing Kobe Flowers and Birds Garden

Tourist attractions in Kobe
Buildings and structures in Kobe
Parks and gardens in Hyōgo Prefecture
Greenhouses in Japan
Zoos in Japan
Aviaries
Zoos established in 2006
2006 establishments in Japan